Foxcroft Towne Center at Martinsburg (formerly Martinsburg Mall) was a regional shopping mall in Martinsburg, West Virginia. Completed in 1991, the mall contained more than 50 retailers, including The Bon-Ton (originally Hess's) and Walmart, which was expanded from a discount store to a Supercenter in 1998. Foxcroft Towne Center at Martinsburg was a retail hub for the Eastern Panhandle of West Virginia. The Martinsburg Mall changed its name to Foxcroft Towne Center at Martinsburg effective October 1, 2015. On September 8, 2016 owners announced that the mall would close on November 1, 2016.  The mall will be demolished, except for The Bon-Ton (which closed in 2018), JCPenney, and Walmart. JCPenney closed on July 31, 2017. They plan on redeveloping the site for more retail.  

As of 2019 the former JCPenney is now a Hobby Lobby and the former Hess's/The Bon-Ton is now Grand Home Furnishings. None of the original mall interior remains except for an empty lot where the middle pavilion and food court once stood. Several Businesses have opened in new buildings built onto the former Sears (which closed in 2011) parking lot of which include FireHouse Subs, Panera Bread, and some empty retail spaces.  The anchor stores are Walmart, Party City, Hobby Lobby, and Grand Home Furnishings.

Location

Foxcroft Towne Center at Martinsburg is at the center of Foxcroft Avenue in Martinsburg, with exits immediately to the north and south of the property off Interstate 81.

References

External links 
 Foxcroft Towne Center at Martinsburg
 DeadMall's Commentary on Martinsburg Mall

Buildings and structures in Martinsburg, West Virginia
Defunct shopping malls in the United States
Shopping malls in West Virginia
Shopping malls established in 1991
Tourist attractions in Berkeley County, West Virginia